The îles de Boynes or Boynes Islands, are four small rocky islands of the Kerguelen archipelago, lying some  south of Presqu'ile Rallier du Baty on the main island, just south of the 50 south parallel.  They were discovered in 1772 by the first expedition of Yves-Joseph de Kerguelen-Trémarec. They were named after the marquis de Boynes, the French Secretary of the Navy of the period.  Except for the controversial disputed claim to Adélie Land, Boynes Islands are the most southerly French land.

References 

Uninhabited islands of the Kerguelen Islands